This is the list of schools providing secondary education in Zagreb, Croatia.

Agricultural School Zagreb
Archdiocesan Classical Gymnasium
Architectural Technical School Zagreb
 Benedikt Kotruljević - high school and school of economics 
Carpenter School Zagreb
Center for education and training of children and youth Dubrava
Center for education and training Slava Raškaj
Center for education and training "Vinko Bek" Zagreb
Classical Gymnasium in Zagreb
College for Jazz and Popular Music
Economics schools:
The First School of Economics Zagreb
The Second School of Economics Zagreb
The Third School of Economics Zagreb
Electrical Engineering Trade School Zagreb
Electrotehnic School Zagreb
First High School of Informatics
First Private Gymnasium Zagreb
The first private school for personal services
First Technical School Tesla
Food Technology School of Zagreb
Geodetic Technical School Zagreb
Gornji Grad Gymnasium
Graphic School in Zagreb
Gymnasiums:
I Gymnasium
II Gymnasium
III Gymnasium
IV Gymnasium
V Gymnasium
VII Gymnasium
IX Gymnasium
X Gymnasium
XI Gymnasium
XII Gymnasium
XIII Gymnasium
XV Gymnasium
XVI Gymnasium 
XVIII Gymnasium
Gymnasium Josip Slavenski Čakovec
Gymnasium Lucijan Vranjanin
Gymnasium Tituš Brezovački
High School - Center for Training and Education Zagreb
High School Sesvete, Sesvete
Hospitality and Tourism College of Zagreb
Hotel and Tourism School in Zagreb
Industrial Engineering School Zagreb
 INOVA  - private school for economics 
Islamic Secondary School "Dr. Ahmed Smajlović"
Jure Kuprešak - the first private tourist and catering high school 
 Katarina Zrinski - private secondary school of economics 
 LINIGRA  - private secondary school
Machinery and Technical School Faust Vrančić
Machinery and Technical School Fran Bošnjaković Zagreb
Medical College Zagreb
Music College Elly Bašić Zagreb
Music School Blagoja Bersa Zagreb
Music School Pavle Markovac Zagreb
Music School Vatroslav Lisinski Zagreb
Music School Zlatko Baloković Zagreb
Natural Scientific School Vladimir Prelog
Postal and Telecommunications School of Zagreb
Private Art Gymnasium
Private Classical Gymnasium Zagreb
 Private economic and IT schools with public rights
Private Gymnasium "Dr.Časl"
Railway Technical School Zagreb
School for Montage of Installation and Metal Structures Zagreb
School for Nurses Mlinarska Zagreb
School for Nurses Vinogradska Zagreb 
School for Nurses Vrapče Zagreb 
School for Road Transport Zagreb
School for Textiles, Leather and Design Zagreb
School of Applied Art and Design Zagreb
School of Classical Ballet Zagreb
School of Contemporary Dance Ana Maletić Zagreb
School of Midwifery Zagreb
The second general private gymnasium
Secondary school of Administration Zagreb
Serbian Orthodox Secondary School "Kantakuzina Katarina Branković"
Sport Gymnasium
 SVIJET - private language and computer gymnasium
Technical School Ruđer Bošković Zagreb
Trade School for Personal Services Zagreb
Trade School Zagreb
Trades and Industry Building School Zagreb
Veterinary School of Zagreb
Women's Gymnasium of the Sisters of Mercy Zagreb
Zagreb Art Gymnasium Zagreb

See also
List of high schools in Croatia

References 

High schools in Zagreb
Zagreb high schools
High school